Parliamentary elections were held in Bulgaria on 17 June 2001. The result was a victory for the National Movement – Simeon II, which won 120 of the 240 seats. Following the elections, Simeon Saxe-Coburg-Gotha, the country's last Tsar, who was deposed by the Bulgarian Communist Party in 1946, became Prime Minister.

Background
The elections came four years after the last parliamentary elections in 1997, marking the first occasion since the fall of communism that a full term had been completed. A total of 65 parties registered for the elections, together with eleven independents.

National Movement – Simeon II was originally prevented from registering by Sofia City Court as it failed to meet the Central Election Committee's requirements. However, after forming an alliance with the Bulgarian Women's Party and the Movement for National Revival, the party was allowed to register.

Results

Aftermath
Following the elections, Simeon Sakskoburggotski became Prime Minister and formed the Sakskoburggotski Government.

A study in the context of the election investigated which societal groups contribute to electoral volatility on the individual level. The findings described that voters belonging to the Turkish minority contribute to party system stability because they were less likely to switch their vote than their Bulgarians or Roma peers. The authors argue that "ethnic socialization provides information shortcuts for vote choice in low-information environments of new democracies." The case is considered evidence that ethnic minorities with relevant ethnic-linguistic parties in new democracies contribute to party system stability.

References

Bulgaria
2001 elections in Bulgaria
Parliamentary elections in Bulgaria
June 2001 events in Europe